Abu Ali al-Rudbari or Abuzer Rudbari, known also as Rudbari, was a famous early Persian sufi saint of the 9th century.  He claimed descent from the Sassanid king Anushiravan and was a disciple of Junayd Baghdadi.

Rudbari's statements are recounted in many sayings of the Islamic world. One of his most famous sayings is: No prison confines more closely than the society of  those whose outlook is contrary to one's own.

See also 
 Ma'ruf al-Karkhi
 Junayd of Baghdad
 Sari al-Saqati
 Najm al-Din Kubra
 Shaikh Asiri Lahiji
 Seyyed Qutb al-Din Mohammad Neyrizi
 Abu al-Najib Suhrawardi
 'Ala' al-Dawla Simnani

Notes

Further reading
Murtaza Muṭahharī, "Understanding Islamic sciences: philosophy, theology, mysticism, morality, jurisprudence", ICAS Press, 2002

Iranian Sufi saints
10th-century Iranian people
9th-century Iranian people